ITE or Ite may refer to:

Places
 Ite (village), Walloon name of the Belgian village of Ittre
 Ite District in Tacna Region, Peru

Brands and enterprises
 Interactive Television Entertainment (ITE), a defunct Danish media company
 ITE Group, an organiser of exhibitions and conferences
 ITE Tech, a fabless semiconductor company from Taiwan

Computing and technology
 If-then-else, conditional expressions in computer programming
 In-the-ear (ITE) hearing aids
 Information technology equipment (ITE)
 Integrated Transcription Environment, a class of transcription software

Organizations
 Institute of Technical Education (Singapore)
 Institute of Transportation Engineers
 L’Internationale des Travailleurs de l’Enseignement, a predecessor organization of the World Federation of Teachers Unions (FISE)

Science
 "Ité", another name for the Moriche Palm (Mauritia flexuosa)
 -ite, a suffix for a chemical name of a molecule with one less oxygen atom than an "-ate" molecule

Other uses
 Inherit the Earth (ITE), a video game
 -ite, a suffix meaning member of or resident of, e.g., New Jerseyite